Ptychadena cooperi is a species of frog in the family Ptychadenidae.
It is endemic to Ethiopia.

Its natural habitats are subtropical or tropical moist montane forest, subtropical or tropical high-altitude grassland, rivers, intermittent rivers, freshwater marshes, intermittent freshwater marshes, pastureland, rural gardens, urban areas, and seasonally flooded agricultural land.
It is threatened by habitat loss.

References

Ptychadena
Amphibians of Ethiopia
Endemic fauna of Ethiopia
Taxonomy articles created by Polbot
Amphibians described in 1930